Raymond Joseph Dolan (born 21 January 1954) is an Irish neuroscientist and the Mary Kinross Professor of Neuropsychiatry at University College London, where he was also the founding director of the Wellcome Trust Centre for Neuroimaging.

Honours and awards
In 2006 he was awarded the Golden Brain Award by the Minerva Foundation.
In 2015 he presented the Paul B. Baltes Lecture at the Berlin-Brandenburg Academy of Sciences and Humanities. He was one of three recipients of the 2017 Brain Prize, along with Peter Dayan and Wolfram Schultz.

He is a fellow of the Royal Society, the Academy of Medical Sciences, and the Association for Psychological Science. In 2016, he was ranked by Semantic Scholar as the second-most influential neuroscientist in the modern world, behind only his UCL colleague Karl Friston.

In 2019 he was awarded the Ferrier Medal and Lecture by the Royal Society.

References

Further reading

External links
Faculty page

Living people
1954 births
Academics of University College London
Fellows of the Royal Society
Irish neuroscientists
Alumni of the National University of Ireland
Fellows of the Academy of Medical Sciences (United Kingdom)
Fellows of the Association for Psychological Science
People from Galway (city)